Richard "Richie" Sumner is a retired Canadian soccer defender who played three seasons in the A-League and one in the National Professional Soccer League.

Sumner attended Simon Fraser University where he was a 1995 First Team NAIA All American soccer player.  In 1996, he turned professional with the Vancouver 86ers of the A-League.  He played three seasons with Vancouver.  Sumner also spent the 1997–1998 National Professional Soccer League season with the Harrisburg Heat.

References

Living people
Canadian soccer players
Canadian expatriate soccer players
A-League (1995–2004) players
Harrisburg Heat players
National Professional Soccer League (1984–2001) players
Simon Fraser Clan men's soccer players
Vancouver Whitecaps (1986–2010) players
Association football defenders
Year of birth missing (living people)